Cathedral High School is a private Catholic high school in Indianapolis, Indiana. The school serves approximately 1,200 students in grades 9 to 12. The school was founded in Archdiocese of Indianapolis by Bishop Joseph Chartrand in 1918 and was run by the Brothers of Holy Cross until it became independent by the late 1970s. Holy Cross returned to the school in 2011.

History
The school was founded as a boys high school by the Brothers of Holy Cross in 1918. In the 1970s, with the departure of the Brothers, a non-profit trust was developed by Robert V. Welch, other parents, and a lay board in an effort to keep Cathedral alive. As part of that change, the school moved from its longtime home in downtown Indianapolis to its present location at 56th and Emerson streets, the site of the former all-girls Ladywood St. Agnes Academy. This change also facilitated the admission of girls to Cathedral High School. The original location of the school at 1400 North Meridian Street is today the headquarters for the Archdiocese of Indianapolis. On September 13, 2011, Cathedral celebrated its 93rd birthday and was formally re-affiliated with the Brothers of Holy Cross.

Academics
The school offers several levels of academics, including Advanced Placement (one of only 14 schools in the state of Indiana) and Dual Credit courses. Cathedral was honored as a Blue Ribbon School four times, in 1988, 2004, 2016, and 2022. Cathedral was the only high school, public or private, in the state of Indiana to receive a Blue Ribbon designation in 2016. No other high school in the state has received the Blue Ribbon award more times.

There are 11 academic departments providing more than 188 course offerings. Three instructional levels are offered-honors, academic, and college preparatory-as well as honors-level independent study in nearly all disciplines. Emphasis is placed on technology in the classroom. In 2012, Cathedral introduced a nationally recognized 1:1 iPad program. Honors and academic-level English students are required to take two years of foreign language. College preparatory English students and students enrolled in the Language Support Program are not required to meet the foreign language requirement, except in unusual circumstances.

The Learning Resource Center, encompassing Cathedral's Language Support Program, is available to meet the special needs of students with diagnosed learning differences such as ADD, ADHD, and autism-spectrum disorder. The Language Support Program is designed specifically to meet the needs of dyslexic students preparing for college entrance. In this program, courses are taught at the academic level of instruction with appropriate accommodations.
 Language Support
 Composition 1
 Economics 1
 English 8
 Fine Arts 2
 Foreign Language 4
 Geography 1
 Government 1
 Health Education 1
 Mathematics 6
 Modern Technology 1
 Other Electives 3
 Physical Education 1
 Religious Studies 8
 Science Electives 4
 Social Studies Electives 2
 Speech or Debate 1
 U.S. History 2

Athletics

Football
For the 2008 Sunday Night Football season on NBC, Cathedral High School's football program was featured because even though the school has more football victories than any school in the state of Indiana, they do not have a home field. Though several games throughout the schedule each year are designated home games, they are played at different fields (such as Indianapolis Arlington High School, Arsenal Technical High School, and the University of Indianapolis) which are not directly affiliated with Cathedral itself. Its two segments aired on November 2 and 9, 2008.

As of the end of the 2013 IHSAA football season, Cathedral had more wins than any other school in the history of the sport in the state of Indiana. The Irish have won over 750 in program history.

As of 2021 Cathedral ranks first on the all-time list for State Finals appearances in Indiana, having reached the title game a total of eighteen times. They won in fourteen of those eighteen appearances (1986, 1992, 1996, 1998, 1999, 2006, 2008, 2010, 2011, 2012,  2013, 2014, 2020, and 2021).

The football team was led by Rick Streiff who coached the team to 9 state championships which ties him for the most championships for a high school football coach in Indiana. In addition to Streiff, the coaching staff is heavily compiled of former NFL and NCAA players such as Mike Prior and Darrick Brownlow.

As of 2022, the football team is coached by Bill Peebles, who has led the Cathedral Fighting Irish to win two back-to-back IHSAA state championships in class AAAAA the second largest class, which was one class above their enrollment numbers, which is class AAAA. As a result, they now will compete in Class AAAAAA, the largest of the six classes and two classes above.

Girls lacrosse
The Cathedral girls lacrosse team has won two State Championships (2015, 2017).

Girls volleyball
The Cathedral Lady Irish volleyball team was coached by former Ball State University All-American Jean Kesterson, who amassed more than 800 wins and eight State Championships (1997, 1999, 2001, 2003, 2006, 2008, 2015 and 2016) in her tenure at the school.
The Cathedral Lady Irish volleyball team won state in 2015.  They were named National Champions by MaxPreps.
The Lady Irish also won state in 2016, and finished first in the national tournament two years in a row (2015 and 2016).

Boys volleyball

Cathedral is one of a group of Indianapolis high schools which fields a team and competes in the Indiana Boys Volleyball Coaches Association. Since boys volleyball is not yet a sanctioned IHSAA sport, the IBVCA stands as the sport's sanctioning body.
Cathedral has won the championship eight times (1999, 2001, 2002, 2004, 2005, 2007, 2008, 2010, 2016) and placed runner-up five times (1994, 1997, 1998, 2003, and 2009).
Between May 2006 and March 2009, Cathedral had an 82-match win-streak, which is a state record.
Following the conclusion of each season, various members of both the Varsity and Junior Varsity squads will form one or more club teams. These clubs travel to the USA Volleyball Boys' Junior Championships and compete against hundreds of other boys' volleyball clubs from around the United States of America. In 2007, the Irish Juniors finished a school record 5th in the national tournament.

Other sports
Boys and girls Soccer
Boys and girls Swimming & Diving
Boys and girls Basketball (Boys 2022 State Champions)
Baseball
Softball
Boys and girls Lacrosse
Boys Golf
Boys Hockey (with seven other high schools as Central Indiana Knights)
Boys and girls Cross Country
Boys and girls Track & Field (Girls 2021 State Champions)
Boys and girls Tennis
Bowling
Gymnastics
Boys Rugby
Wrestling

History

 Cathedral was the first all-white school to play Crispus Attucks High School, at the time an all-black school, in athletics.
 Before 1942, Cathedral was not a part of the IHSAA so any titles they won prior to this were not accepted by the IHSAA.

Extracurricular activities

Performing arts

The Performing Arts department at Cathedral is a student driven program. Since 1999  the season had comprised five shows: The Festival of One Acts, the Fall Production, the Children's Play, the Rookie Show, and the Spring Musical. Beginning in the 2008-2009 school year the theater program has comprised a season of three theatrical productions and one musical per year. During the Fall Semester, students have performed the Fall Play and the Children's Show. During the Spring Semester, there has been the traditional musical and the new Rookie Showcase (a series of short one act plays). The Children's Show and the Rookie Showcase (and in the past, the Rookie Show and the Festival of One Acts) are student directed, while the Spring Musical and the Fall Show are teacher-directed. The school has light and stage design, a newly renovated Scene Shop, Costume Department, Green Room, and Dressing Rooms. All productions are created by the students. They build the sets, sew the costumes, design lighting, and acquire props.

Academic classes in the department include the independent study technical classes and the Advanced Acting and Directing classes producing the leads, directors, ADs, stage managers, and lighting and sound designers for most of the shows. The majority of students who take these upper-level classes will at least minor in some aspect of theater or performing arts, with students matriculating to, among others, Ball State University, Columbia University in Chicago, Indiana University, and Purdue University.

The school is a member of the International Thespian Society.

The Pride of the Irish Marching Band
The school has a marching band, the Pride of the Irish. The band marched in the Dublin, Ireland St. Patrick's Day parade in both 2000, 2008, and in 2015 and was featured on national TV in the Hollywood Thanksgiving Day parade in 2005, marched in the King Kamehameha Parade in Honolulu, Hawaii in 2002; performed on board the Music on the Seas Royal Caribbean cruise in 2004, and performed in Toronto, Ontario, Canada in 1998.

Mary sculpture

The sculpture Mary is mounted in a limestone niche on the main school building facade. Created by an unknown artist in 1963, the  statue is painted and appears to be made of concrete. The statue is a full-length robed representation of the Virgin Mary, standing with her hands outstretched with her palms facing upwards. The sculpture was surveyed in 1994 by the Smithsonian's Save Outdoor Sculpture! survey program and its condition was described as needing treatment.

Controversy 
In June 2019, Charles C. Thompson, the Archbishop of Indianapolis, asked the school to fire a teacher involved in a same-sex marriage or else the archdiocese would end its association with the school. The same request was given to Brebeuf Jesuit Preparatory School. Cathedral opted to dismiss the teacher, while Brebeuf gave a strong rebuke saying this "highly capable and qualified teacher" will continue to teach here. Cathedral noted that they would have lost permission to refer to itself as a Catholic school, the ability to celebrate the Sacraments, and its status as an independent nonprofit organization.

Notable people

 Gregory A. Ballard (class of 1972), Mayor of Indianapolis 2008-16
 Ken Barlow (class of 1982), Notre Dame and professional basketball player
 Blaine Bishop (class of 1988), NFL player, 4-time Pro Bowl safety
 Darrick Brownlow (class of 1987), University of Illinois and NFL player
 Mark Clayton (class of 1979), NFL player, 5-time Pro Bowl wide receiver
 Jack Doyle (class of 2008), NFL player for Indianapolis Colts, 2-time Pro Bowl tight end
 Jake Fox (class of 2000), professional baseball player
 Moe Gardner (class of 1986), 2-time NCAA All-American and NFL professional player
 Cole Hocker (class of 2019), 2021 National Champion and Olympic finalist in the 1500 meters
 Chris Huffins (class of 1988), 2000 Summer Olympics decathlete
 Tommy Hunter (class of 2005), Major League baseball player for Tampa Bay Rays
 Ted Karras (class of 2012), NFL lineman for Cincinnati Bengals, 2-time Super Bowl champion
 Mathias Kiwanuka (class of 2001), NFL player for New York Giants, 2-time Super Bowl champion
 Terry McLaurin (class of 2014), wide receiver for the Washington Commanders
 James E. Muller (class of 1961), co-founder International Physicians for the Prevention of Nuclear War.[1] This organization was awarded the Nobel Peace Prize in 1985
 Ray Oyler (class of 1955), professional baseball player for 1968 World Series champion Detroit Tigers
 Samantha Peszek (class of 2010), Olympic silver medalist gymnast
 Dillon Peters (class of 2011), pitcher for Miami Marlins, Los Angeles Angels
 Tanya Walton Pratt (class of 1977), federal judge
 Jeremy Trueblood (class of 2001), NFL football player
 Sean Woods (class of 1988), basketball head coach of Morehead State 2012-16
Pete Werner (class of 2017), NFL football player

See also
 List of high schools in Indiana

References

External links
Cathedral School Snapshot

Schools in Indianapolis
Catholic secondary schools in Indiana
Private high schools in Indiana
Roman Catholic Archdiocese of Indianapolis
Educational institutions established in 1918
IHSAA Conference-Independent Schools
Outdoor sculptures in Indianapolis
1963 sculptures
1918 establishments in Indiana